The Whitmore Stakes is a Grade III American Thoroughbred horse race for four-year-olds and older at a distance of six furlongs on the dirt run annually in March at Oaklawn Park Race Track in Hot Springs, Arkansas.  The event currently offers a purse of $200,000.

History
The February 28, 1944 inaugural running of the event as the Hot Springs Purse at six furlongs was run on a heavy track. The race was won by Momo Flag, owned and trained by Adelard Lamoureux and ridden by Cuban jockey Jorge Alfonso. On November 15, 1944, Momo Flag showed he was far more than just a sprinter when he won the Exterminator Handicap at Pimlico Race Course over the marathon distance of two miles and 70 yards. Remarkably, after that grueling distance to the finish line, Momo Flag only beat Miss Ruth McClanaghan's Harford by a nose.
The following year the event was run in early December as the Hot Springs Handicap for two-year-olds over a distance of one mile and seventy yards. The event was idle for the next two calendar years.

For three-year-olds (1948–74) 

In 1948, when the event was resumed the Oaklawn Park administration set the conditions of the event for three-year-olds only at a distance of six furlongs. The event was scheduled earlier in the Oaklawn Park season and it became a preparatory race for the Arkansas Derby. Enforcer who finished second to Cotton Joe in the 1948 renewal also finished second in the Arkansas Derby.

In 1951 the event was scheduled to be run on Saturday, March 3 but there were not enough entries to fill the event so the track administration scheduled an event that was called the Mountain Valley Allowance for a much lower purse of $1,500. Eleven three-year-olds entered for this event.

The first horse to win the Hot Springs Handicap and then go on to win the Arkansas Derby was Mrs. Elizabeth Muckler's Johns Chic who won the double in 1956. In 1965 Earl Allen's Swift Ruler would also win the Hot Springs Handicap, the Rebel Stakes (introduced for three-year-olds in 1961) and the Arkansas Derby. 

In 1966 the event was run at a distance of  furlongs for the only time. In 1967 Dr. Keith Knapp's Roman K. set a new track record for the six furlongs distance of 1:09 flat defeating seven other three-year-olds.
 
As a Three-Year-Old handicap five fillies won the event. The most successful of the fillies was the 1957 winner Lori El. She was a gallant third in the Arkansas Derby and later in May won the Kentucky Oaks. 

In 1974 the event was run for the last time as a Three-Year-Old only event and the winner, J. R.'s Pet won by a seven-length margin which continues to date to be the record winning margin. J. R.'s Pet also went on to win the Arkansas Derby.

Open era (1975 onwards) 
With the creation of new events for three-year-olds, Rebel Stakes in 1961 and the Southwest Stakes in 1968 over six furlongs, Oaklawn Park administration changed the condition of the event in 1975 to three-year-olds and older. Three years later in 1978 the event would omit three-year-olds all together as the conditions for the event became four-year-olds and older.

In 1986 the distance of the event was increased to one mile, but this only lasted for three years. In 1988 the conditions of the event were changed from a handicap to a stakes event with allowances and the name changed to the Hot Springs Stakes.

Wilbur M. Giles' gelding E J Harley won the race in three consecutive years (1998, 1999, 2000).  The 2014 winner Work All Week went on to win that year's Breeders' Cup Sprint and would be voted American Champion Sprint Horse.

The event encountered its third  result in 2009, thirty years after the first dead heat which took place in 1979.
 
With increased revenue from the racino the administration of the track in 2017 began increasing the purse offered for the event. In 2017 the event offered $125,000 and by 2021 an attractive purse of $200,000 was up for grabs. This increase in stakes started to attract much more accomplished sprinters such as Breeders' Cup Sprint winner and US Champion Sprint Horse, Whitmore. In September 2021, Oaklawn Park announced that the Hot Springs Stakes would be renamed to the Whitmore Stakes, after retired thoroughbred sprinter Whitmore. Owned by the partnership group of Robert LaPenta, trainer Ron Moquett and Head of Plains Partners, Whitmore broke E J Harley's record with four consecutive Hot Springs Stakes wins between 2017 and 2020. 

In 2022 the American Graded Stakes Committee upgraded the classification of the event after 75 runnings to Grade III.

Records
Speed record:
6 furlongs: 1:08.40 – Double Ready  (1984)

Margins:
7 lengths – J. R.'s Pet  (1974)

Most wins:
 4 – Whitmore  (2017, 2018, 2019, 2020)

Most wins by an owner:
 4 – Robert V. LaPenta & Head of Plains Partners  (2017, 2018, 2019, 2020)

Most wins by a jockey:
 4 – Pat Day (1986, 1991, 1992, 1995)

Most wins by a trainer:
 5 – Robert E. Holthus (1989, 1991, 1992, 2002, 2004)
 5 – Ron Moquett  (2015, 2017, 2018, 2019, 2020)

Winners

Notes:

§ Ran as an entry

ƒ Filly or Mare

† In the 1981 running Gallant Serenade was first past the post but later was disqualified from the winner's prize money after failing a post race drug test. J Burns was declared the winner and all placegetters were moved up, Convenient to second and Royal Vertex to third. Trainer of Gallant Serenade, James R. Garroutte was suspended for the remainder of the Oaklawn season.

See also
List of American and Canadian Graded races

External sites
Oaklawn Park Media Guide 2020

References

Horse races in Arkansas
Graded stakes races in the United States
Grade 3 stakes races in the United States
Open sprint category horse races
Recurring sporting events established in 1944
1944 establishments in Arkansas
Oaklawn Park